Zamira Alimradovna Rakhmanova (born December 28, 1985, Kaspiysk, Dagestan ASSR, USSR) is a female wrestler from Russia of Lezgin ancestry. Zamira participated at the 2008 Summer Olympics.

External links
 
 

Living people
1985 births
Russian female sport wrestlers
Olympic wrestlers of Russia
Wrestlers at the 2008 Summer Olympics
People from Kaspiysk
World Wrestling Championships medalists
Lezgins
Sportspeople from Dagestan
20th-century Russian women
21st-century Russian women